"Hold Up a Light" is the fifth and final single from British group Take That's fifth studio album, The Circus. It was released to promote Take That's first live album The Greatest Day – Take That Presents: The Circus Live.

Background
"Hold Up a Light" was written by band members Gary Barlow, Howard Donald, Jason Orange, Mark Owen, along with live band members Jamie Norton and Ben Mark. It was released to radio stations and as a digital download on 14 December 2009. It features Owen on lead vocals, with Barlow taking a partial lead. The song was released as a single after its successful reception from fans whilst on tour. The physical version of the single was available to buy exclusively at stalls around the stadium during their Circus Tour, as well as for a short period of time through Take That's official website. The song charted at number 8 on the UK Airplay Charts and at number 123 on the UK Singles Chart.
The song also featured on Take That's Progress Live tour, where they performed it together before reuniting with Robbie Williams.

Critical reception

The Guardian said the song was designed "to encourage a lighters-aloft moment." BBC Music described the track as "perky" and "magical". Digital Spy noted: " 'Hold Up a Light', led by Mark Owen, is a fist-pumping anthem that will require a lot of ticker tape when played live."

Music video
The official music video for "Hold Up a Light" was premiered on The One Show. The video sees the four band members performing the song live on the Wembley leg of their record breaking Circus Tour.

Personnel
Mark Owen – lead vocals, backing vocals
Gary Barlow – backing vocals
Howard Donald – backing vocals
Jason Orange – backing vocals

Track listing
 "Hold Up a Light" – 4:28
 "Hold Up a Light" (live at Wembley Stadium) – 4:30

Chart positions

References

2009 singles
Take That songs
Songs written by Gary Barlow
Songs written by Jason Orange
Songs written by Howard Donald
Songs written by Mark Owen
Songs written by Jamie Norton
Songs written by Ben Mark
2008 songs